South Truro station was a train station located in the southern part of Truro, Massachusetts. The first passenger service was on 23 July 1873.

Passenger service through Truro to Provincetown ended in July 1938, but freight service survived until 1960, when the tracks above North Eastham were abandoned.

References

External links

Truro, Massachusetts
Old Colony Railroad Stations on Cape Cod
Stations along Old Colony Railroad lines
Demolished buildings and structures in Massachusetts
Former railway stations in Massachusetts